Sander Arends and Antonio Šančić were the defending champions but chose not to defend their title.

Andre Begemann and Dustin Brown won the title after defeating Martin Kližan and Filip Polášek 3–6, 6–4, [10–5] in the final.

Seeds

Draw

References
 Main Draw

Città di Como Challenger - Doubles
2018 Doubles